The Korfbal League is the highest echelon of korfball in the Netherlands. The league was founded in 2005 as the new highest level in Dutch korfball. Before that the top level was split in two divisions. Since the start of the competition the format has been the same. The winner of the Korfbal League qualifies for the IKF Europa Korfball Cup while the number 10 relegated to the Hoofdklasse (korfball). The number 9 will compete with the loser of the Hoofdklasse final in a play-off for a position in the Korfbal League.

History

The Royal Dutch Korfball Association started the Korfbal League in 2005 to make top level korfball more attractive for the public. This was done by fusing the former two divisions into one. But also by introducing new rules to improve the speed of the game, the most notable of the changes was the introduction of the Shot clock. Further branding was done by introducing a clear logo, a new website and more representative sports clothing.

The first edition of the league in 2005/2006 was won by DOS'46.

Champions

References

2005 establishments in the Netherlands
Sports leagues in the Netherlands
Sports leagues established in 2005